August Meitzen (born 16 December 1822, in Breslau; died 19 January 1910, in Berlin) was a German statistician.

Biography
He was born in Breslau (now Wrocław, Poland) and educated at Heidelberg and Tübingen. He was a prominent member of the Statistical Bureau, and in 1875 was made an associate professor of political sciences (Staatswissenschaften) at the University of Berlin (honorary professor from 1892).

Works
His contributions to the science of statistics include:
 Die internationale land- und forstwirtschaftliche Statistik ("International statistics on land and forest management"; 1873).
 Geschichte, Theorie und Technik der Statistik ("History, theory and technique of statistics"; 1886).
He also wrote:
 Der Boden und die landwirthschaftlichen Verhältnisse des Preussischen Staates ("The soil and the agricultural conditions of the Prussian state"; 8 volumes and 2 atlases, 1868–1908).
 Die Mitverantwortlichkeit der Gebildeten für das Wohl der arbeitenden Klassen (The obligation of the educated to the well-being of the working classes; 1876).
 Siedelung und Agrarwesen der Westgermanen und Ostgermanen, der Kelten, Römer, Finnen und Slawen ("Settlement and agriculture of the west and east Germans, the Celts, Romans, Finns and Slavs"; 1895).
He was the author of several biographies in the Allgemeine Deutsche Biographie.

Notes

References
 

German statisticians
1822 births
1910 deaths
Clergy from Wrocław
Heidelberg University alumni
University of Tübingen alumni
Academic staff of the Humboldt University of Berlin